Lesbian, gay, bisexual, and transgender (LGBT) persons in the U.S. state of North Carolina may face legal challenges not experienced by non-LGBT residents, or LGBT residents of other states with more liberal laws.

Same-sex sexual activity is legal in North Carolina, and the state has recognized same-sex marriage since October 10, 2014. However, an amendment to a bill prohibiting discrimination against LGBT persons in charter schools has not been signed into law.

Laws regarding same-sex sexual activity
The U.S. Supreme Court ruling in Lawrence v. Texas (2003) held laws criminalizing consensual homosexual activity between adults unconstitutional.

In State v. Whiteley (2005), the North Carolina Court of Appeals ruled that the crime against nature statute, N.C. G.S. § 14-177, is not unconstitutional on its face because it may properly be used to criminalize sexual conduct involving minors, non-consensual or coercive conduct, public conduct, and prostitution.

The state's sodomy law, though unenforceable, has not been repealed.

Recognition of same-sex relationships

Marriage
North Carolina has recognized same-sex marriages since October 14, 2014, when a federal court decision found the state's denial of marriage rights to same-sex couples unconstitutional. The state formerly banned same-sex marriage and all other types of same-sex unions both by statute and by constitutional amendment until the ban was overturned by a federal court decision.

North Carolina had previously denied marriage rights to same-sex couples by statute since 1996. A state constitutional amendment that was approved in 2012 reinforced that by defining marriage between a man and a woman as the only valid "domestic legal union" in the state and denying recognition to any similar legal status, such as civil unions.

Constitutional ban

In September 2011, the North Carolina General Assembly passed North Carolina Senate Bill 514 (2011) which put an amendment banning any form of same-sex unions on the primary election ballot in May 2012. The measure passed on a vote of 30–16 in the state Senate and a vote of 74–42 in the state House.

Voters approved the amendment by 61% to 39% on May 8, 2012. North Carolina was the 30th state, and the last of the former Confederate states, to adopt a constitutional amendment banning same-sex marriage. The amendment added to Section XVI of the Constitution of North Carolina:

Lawsuits

General Synod of the United Church of Christ v. Cooper
On April 28, 2014, the United Church of Christ and other religious organizations filed General Synod of the United Church of Christ v. Cooper, arguing that North Carolina's statute that makes it a crime to preside at the solemnization of the marriage of a couple that lacks a valid state marriage license  unconstitutionally restricts religious freedom. On October 10, District Court Judge Max O. Cogburn, Jr. ruled the state's ban on same-sex marriage unconstitutional.

Fisher-Borne v. Smith and Gerber v. Cooper
On June 13, 2012, six same-sex couples filed a federal lawsuit, Fisher-Borne v. Smith, that initially sought the right to obtain second-parent adoptions. In July 2013, following the U.S. Supreme Court decision in United States v. Windsor in June, they amended their suit to challenge the constitutionality of the state's denial of marriage rights to same-sex couples. Briefing was completed on August 13, 2014. On April 9, 2014, the American Civil Liberties Union filed Gerber v. Cooper in the United States District Court for the Middle District of North Carolina, seeking state recognition of same-sex marriages established outside of North Carolina. Plaintiffs are three couples: Ginter-Mejia and Esmeralda Mejia, Jane Blackburn and Lyn McCoy, Pearl Berlin and Ellen W. Gerber. A judge has not yet been assigned in this case. On October 14, U.S. District Judge William Osteen ruled for the plaintiffs.

Domestic partnership

The counties of Durham, Orange, Mecklenburg, and Buncombe; the cities of Durham, Greensboro, Asheville, and Charlotte; and the towns of Carrboro and Chapel Hill have established domestic partnership registries.

Hospital visitation
In 2008, the North Carolina General Assembly added a provision to the Patients' Bill of Rights affording hospital visitation rights to same-sex couples though a designated visitor statute.

Adoption rights
Some lower courts allowed second-parent adoptions until the North Carolina Supreme Court ruled 5–2 in 2010 in the case of Boseman v. Jarell that the state law did not permit adoption by a second unmarried person irrespective of the sex of those involved. The plaintiff in that case was Julia Boseman, first openly gay member of the state legislature. On June 13, 2012, 11 same-sex couples sued several state and local officials in federal court seeking second-parent adoption rights. In 2013 they amended their suit to challenge the constitutionality of the state's denial of marriage rights to same-sex couples. On October 14, U.S. District Judge William Osteen ruled for the plaintiffs.

Foster parenting
In November 2021, it was reported that the Governor of North Carolina Roy Cooper signed a bill into law legally banning discrimination - explicitly listing sexual orientation within foster parenting placements. The law went into effect from January 1, 2022.

Discrimination protections

State law previously banned local municipalities from prohibiting discrimination on the basis of sexual orientation or gender identity in areas other than public employment, but this ban expired on December 1, 2020.

The counties of Buncombe, Mecklenburg, and Orange and the cities of Asheville, Boone, Carrboro, Chapel Hill, Charlotte, Greensboro, Raleigh, and Winston-Salem prohibit discrimination on the basis of sexual orientation and gender identity in local public employment. The counties of Durham and Guilford along with the cities of Bessemer City, Durham, and High Point prohibit local public discrimination on the basis of sexual orientation only.

The University of North Carolina system, which comprises North Carolina's 16 public universities, established a policy of non-discrimination with regard to sexual orientation and gender identity in employment and for students, which is now in partially in conflict with the Public Facilities Privacy & Security Act.

Appalachian State University, Fayetteville State University, North Carolina Agricultural and Technical State University, North Carolina Central University, North Carolina State University, University of North Carolina at Asheville, University of North Carolina at Chapel Hill, University of North Carolina at Charlotte, University of North Carolina at Greensboro, and University of North Carolina at Pembroke have established non-discrimination policies that cover sexual orientation and gender identity in employment and admissions. East Carolina University, University of North Carolina at Wilmington, University of North Carolina School of the Arts, Western Carolina University, and Winston-Salem State University have established non-discrimination policies that cover sexual orientation in employment and admissions. Elizabeth City State University is the only public university in North Carolina that has not established a non-discrimination policy in respect to either sexual orientation or gender identity for employees or students.

The North Carolina Housing Finance Agency has a policy which provides "all employees and applicants for employment with equal employment opportunities, without regard to race, color, religion, creed, gender, sexual orientation, national origin, age, disability, political affiliation, or any other protected status".

On June 26, 2014, the North Carolina House of Representatives passed by a 115–0 vote for an amendment to bill that prohibits discrimination in charter schools on the basis of any "category protected under the United States Constitution or under federal law applicable to the states." The amendment was later removed in the North Carolina State Senate and not included in the final bill signed into law.

On April 12, 2016, North Carolina Governor Pat McCrory signed an Executive Order outlawing LGBT discrimination in any public employment within the state, though it did not impact the controversial HB2 legislation.
In October 2017, Governor Roy Cooper extended this discrimination protection to businesses that contract with the state.

Public Facilities Privacy & Security Act 

Passed in March 2016, the law also known as "HB2" prevents local governments from enacting policies contrary to state law in regards to hiring and use of bathroom facilities, and requires all people to use the bathroom of the gender listed on the person's birth certificate.  The portion of the law regarding bathroom use based on gender at birth was repealed by the state legislature on March 30, 2017, and signed into law by North Carolina Governor Roy Cooper the very same day.

House Bill 142

Charlotte ordinance 

In August 2021, a local ordinance was passed within the city of Charlotte - to explicitly outlaw and ban discrimination on the basis of both sexual orientation and gender identity. It goes into legal effect from January 1, 2022.

Catholic school case
In September 2021, a Catholic school fired a gay teacher back in 2014 and a federal judge ordered that he be reinstated immediately - because legally Catholic schools can't fire gay teachers under federal jurisdiction. This case will possibly be appealed in higher courts (and maybe as far as the Supreme Court of the United States).

Wake County ordinance
In October 2021, Wake County passed a legal ordinance to explicitly legally ban discrimination on the basis of both sexual orientation and gender identity. About 30% of the North Carolina population is now legally protected from discrimination on the basis of both sexual orientation and gender identity by locally enforced ordinances.

Hate crime law
North Carolina's hate crime statute does not cover sexual orientation or gender identity.

Domestic violence protection
In January 2021, a federal judge struck down the only US state law left being North Carolina - that did not recognise same-sex domestic violence. Domestic violence protection laws are now extended to include same-sex couples.

Conversion therapy

On August 3, 2019, the North Carolina Governor Roy Cooper signed an executive order within his office - explicitly banning any state funding of conversion therapy on minors. This is the first time a southern US state has done this.

Transgender rights

Gender identity documents 
On June 26, 2022, a federal judge ruled that gender-affirming surgery was no longer required for North Carolina changes to the gender marker on North Carolina birth certificates. This was the result of a lawsuit filed by Lambda Legal in November 2021; the lawsuit had complained that the existing law required "sex reassignment surgery" without defining it.

Students 
On February 7, 2023, the state Senate passed a bill to require teachers to notify parents if a student questions their gender. The state House had not yet approved it.

Summary table

See also
 Law of North Carolina

References

LGBT rights in North Carolina